Norrån is a river in Södermanland, Sweden.

External links

Norrån

Rivers of Stockholm County